The 1986–87 Bundesliga was the 24th season of the Bundesliga, the premier football league in West Germany. It began on 8 August 1986 and ended on 17 June 1987. FC Bayern Munich were the defending champions.

Competition modus
Every team played two games against each other team, one at home and one away. Teams received two points for a win and one point for a draw. If two or more teams were tied on points, places were determined by goal difference and, if still tied, by goals scored. The team with the most points were crowned champions while the two teams with the fewest points were relegated to 2. Bundesliga. The third-to-last team had to compete in a two-legged relegation/promotion play-off against the third-placed team from 2. Bundesliga.

Team changes to 1985–86
1. FC Saarbrücken and Hannover 96 were directly relegated to the 2. Bundesliga after finishing in the last two places. They were replaced by FC Homburg and SpVgg Blau-Weiß 1890 Berlin. Relegation/promotion play-off participant Borussia Dortmund won a decisive third match, which had become necessary after the regular two-legged series ended in an aggregated tie, against SC Fortuna Köln and thus retained their Bundesliga status.

Team overview

 Waldhof Mannheim played their matches in nearby Ludwigshafen because their own ground did not fulfil Bundesliga requirements.

League table

Results

Relegation play-offs
FC Homburg and third-placed 2. Bundesliga team FC St. Pauli had to compete in a two-legged relegation/promotion play-off. Homburg won 4–3 on aggregate and retained their Bundesliga status.

Top goalscorers
24 goals
  Uwe Rahn (Borussia Mönchengladbach)

23 goals
  Fritz Walter (SV Waldhof Mannheim)

22 goals
  Rudi Völler (SV Werder Bremen)

20 goals
  Norbert Dickel (Borussia Dortmund)

17 goals
  Frank Hartmann (1. FC Kaiserslautern)
  Frank Mill (Borussia Dortmund)

16 goals
  Jürgen Klinsmann (VfB Stuttgart)
  Harald Kohr (1. FC Kaiserslautern)

15 goals
  Herbert Waas (Bayer 04 Leverkusen)

14 goals
  Klaus Allofs (1. FC Köln)
  Jørn Andersen (1. FC Nürnberg)
  Lothar Matthäus (FC Bayern Munich)
  Christian Schreier (Bayer 04 Leverkusen)
  Wolfram Wuttke (1. FC Kaiserslautern)
  Michael Zorc (Borussia Dortmund)

Champion squad

See also
 1986–87 2. Bundesliga
 1986–87 DFB-Pokal

References

External links
 DFB Bundesliga archive 1986/1987

Bundesliga seasons
1
Germany